Achieving The Perfect 10 is a television documentary film released on CNN on August 10, 2003 about young girls training gymnastics at the highly competitive Parkettes National Gymnastics Training Center in Allentown, Pennsylvania.

The documentary follows several Parkettes gymnasts—ranging from the novice competitor Ashley Barry to the elites Nicole Harris, Annie Fogerty and Kristina Coccia—through their daily training routines. It focuses largely on the dynamics between the athletes and their coaches, their parents' sacrifices, expectations and observations, and their experiences dealing with injuries and preparing for competitions.

Several sequences in the documentary have sparked controversy and debate in the gymnastics community and others, such as one in which a seven-year-old gymnast works out on a broken ankle at the urging of her parents. After it was aired for the first time on CNN, Parkettes' coaches and some gymnasts stated that the documentary did not present an accurate picture of the gym.

Starring
Ashley Barry, Kayla Stark, Nicole Harris, Annie Fogerty, Kristina Coccia, Krista Jasper, Kristen Maloney, Paige Cipolloni, Kristal Uzelac, Kristie Phillips, Donna Strauss, Tia Orlando, Geralen "Lou" Stack-Eaton, John Min, and others.

External links
Transcript at CNN.com
Comments from Kristina Coccia regarding the documentary

2003 television films
2003 films
Gymnastics mass media
American sports documentary films
Parkettes
Sports in Allentown, Pennsylvania
Films shot in Allentown, Pennsylvania
Films set in Pennsylvania
American documentary television films
2000s American films